Hemant Birje (born 19 August 1965) is an Indian actor who works primarily in Hindi language films. In 1985, he debuted as Tarzan in Babbar Subhash's  Adventures of Tarzan, also starring Kimi Katkar. He has had mixed success in later films. He was a regular actor in Mithun Chakraborty films. In 2005, Birje appeared in Garv: Pride and Honour, starring Salman Khan. He has also appeared in Malayalam and Telugu movies.

Partial filmography
Adventures of Tarzan (1985)
Aaj Ke Angaarey
Tahkhana (1986) as Heera
Veerana (1988)
Commando (1988) as Dilher Singh
Kabrastan (1988) as Rocky D'Souza
Maar Dhaad (1988) as Shankar
Sindoor Aur Bandook (1989)
Sau Saal Baad
Aag Ke Sholay 
Paanch Fauladi
Ab Meri Baari
Junglee Tarzan
Lashkar
Chandaal (1998) as Hemant
Suraj (1997) as Ramaftar in guest appearance
Kasam Dhande Ki
The Magnificent Guardian
Aaj Ka Samson
Kaun Kare Kurbanie (1991) as Shyam
Ikke Pe Ikka
Angaara (1996) as Chotu
Muqadar (1996) as Sudhir
Indraprastham (1996) as Shyam Kaushik
Sher-E-Hindustan (1998) as 1st son of Choudhary
Divine Lovers (1997) as Chandra
Bhooka Sher 
Hitler
Tarzan Ki Beti
Zakhmi Sherni
Sikandar Sadak Ka
Hafta Vasuli (1998) as Tamancha Bihari
Tahkhana (1986) as Heera
Aaya Toofan (1999) as Sultan Balachi
Teri Mohabbat Ke Naam (1999) as Police Inspector Kulkarni
Maa Kasam (1999) as Anand
Shiva Ka Insaaf (2003)
Bhairav (2001) as gang
Arjun Devaa (2001) as Yogeshwar Choudhry
Lakeer - Forbidden Lines (2004) as Anees
Saugandh Geeta Ki (2001)
Garv: Pride and Honour (2004) as Majid Khan
Team: The Force (2009)
Galiyon Ka Badshah
Jagira
Kasam
 Surya (2023 Marathi-language film)

References

External links
 
 Hemant Birje at Bollywood Hungama

Indian male film actors
Living people
Male actors in Hindi cinema
Male actors in Malayalam cinema
20th-century Indian male actors
21st-century Indian male actors
Male actors in Telugu cinema
1965 births